Richard Pendlebury (1847, Liverpool – 1902) was a British mathematician, musician, bibliophile and  mountaineer.

Educated at Liverpool College, he went up to St John's College, Cambridge in 1866 and graduated senior wrangler in 1870: he was then elected to a college fellowship. He was appointed University Lecturer in Mathematics in 1888. He collected early mathematical books and printed music, donating his collections to his college and university. His presentation of a collection of music books and manuscripts to the Fitzwilliam Museum stimulated the formation of the Music Faculty at Cambridge University.

In 1872, along with the guide Ferdinand Imseng and other climbers, he made the first ascent of the Monte Rosa east face from Macugnaga.

References

 Anna Pensaert, "The Pendlebury Library of Music", Cambridge University Libraries Information Bulletin (n.s.) 51 (Lent 2006)

External links
 Richard Pendelbury at St John's College Library

1847 births
1902 deaths
19th-century English mathematicians
People educated at Liverpool College
Alumni of St John's College, Cambridge
Fellows of St John's College, Cambridge
English book and manuscript collectors
Senior Wranglers